South West Cambridgeshire is a former United Kingdom Parliamentary constituency. Created in 1983 upon the abolition of the Cambridgeshire constituency, it was abolished in 1997 and succeeded by the constituencies of South Cambridgeshire and Huntingdon.

Boundaries
The District of South Cambridgeshire wards of Arrington, Barrington and Shepreth, Barton, Bassingbourn, Bourn, Comberton, Duxford, Foxton, Gamlingay, Great Shelford, Hardwick, Harston, Haslingfield, Ickleton, Little Shelford, Melbourn, Meldreth, Orwell, Papworth, Sawston, Stapleford, The Mordens, and Whittlesford, the District of Huntingdon wards of Buckden, Eaton Ford, Eaton Socon, Eynesbury, Gransden, Paxton, Priory Park, Staughton, and The Offords, and the City of Cambridge wards of Queen Edith's and Trumpington.

The seat was created for the 1983 general election which followed on from the merger under the Local Government Act 1972, of the two administrative counties of Huntingdon and Peterborough and Cambridgeshire and Isle of Ely to form the non-metropolitan county of Cambridgeshire, with effect from 1 April 1974. The constituency combined territory from three pre-1974 local authorities: the south west part of the abolished administrative county of Cambridgeshire; the south of Huntingdonshire, including St Neots; and two wards from Cambridge.

52.6% of the constituency came from the old administrative county and parliamentary constituency of Cambridgeshire, 29.7% originated from the former administrative county and county constituency of Huntingdonshire and the remaining 17.7% was transferred from the  borough constituency of Cambridge.

The seat was abolished for the 1997 general election, as western parts, comprising the area formerly in Huntingdonshire was transferred to the Huntingdon constituency.  Remaining, southern parts formed the bulk of the new County Constituency of South Cambridgeshire.

Members of Parliament

Elections

See also
Parliamentary representation from Cambridgeshire
List of former United Kingdom Parliament constituencies

Notes and references

Sources
 Boundaries of Parliamentary Constituencies 1885-1972, compiled and edited by F.W.S. Craig (Parliamentary Reference Publications 1972)
 British Parliamentary Constituencies: A Statistical Compendium, by Ivor Crewe and Anthony Fox (Faber and Faber 1984)

Parliamentary constituencies in Cambridgeshire (historic)
Constituencies of the Parliament of the United Kingdom established in 1983
Constituencies of the Parliament of the United Kingdom disestablished in 1997